Thomas Macdonald-Paterson (9 May 1844 – 21 March 1906) was an Australian politician, a member of the Parliament of Queensland, and later, the Parliament of Australia.

Early life
Macdonald-Paterson was born in Glasgow, Scotland, he was educated there privately before migrating to Australia in 1861, where he became a butcher, speculator and lawyer.

Politics
In 1878 he was elected to the Legislative Assembly of Queensland as the member for Rockhampton; he transferred to Moreton in 1883 and to the Legislative Council in 1885, remaining there until 1887. He was a delegate to the Federation Convention of 1891, and returned to the Legislative Assembly in 1896 as the member for North Brisbane.

In 1901 he transferred to federal politics, winning the Australian House of Representatives seat of Brisbane. Although there was no protectionist organisation in Queensland, he joined the Protectionist Party when the parliament sat. In 1903, the National Liberal Union (a protectionist organisation) endorsed another candidate William Morse in Brisbane, and the division of the protectionist vote allowed a Labor candidate Millice Culpin to defeat Macdonald-Paterson.

Later life
He died in 1906 and was buried in Toowong Cemetery.

References

Protectionist Party members of the Parliament of Australia
Members of the Australian House of Representatives for Brisbane
Members of the Australian House of Representatives
1844 births
1906 deaths
Members of the Queensland Legislative Assembly
Members of the Queensland Legislative Council
Burials at Toowong Cemetery
Independent members of the Parliament of Australia
19th-century Australian politicians
20th-century Australian politicians
Scottish emigrants to colonial Australia